Lygropia glaphyra is a moth in the family Crambidae. It is found in French Guiana.

The wingspan is about 13 mm. The forewings are bronzy brown-black with a small yellow costal spot at the outer third. There is a narrow band at the basal third. The hindwings are yellow at the base.

References

Moths described in 1914
Lygropia